The 1938–39 League of Ireland was the eighteenth season of the League of Ireland. Shamrock Rovers were the defending champions.

Shamrock Rovers won their sixth title, and in doing so, became the first team to successfully defend their title.

Overview
Cork folded during the previous season, with Cork City taking their place.

Teams

Table

Results

Top goalscorers

Ireland
Lea
League of Ireland seasons